Cervières is a commune in the Hautes-Alpes department in southeastern France.

The village lies at the foot of the Col d'Izoard, which is often on the route of the Tour de France and Giro d'Italia.

Population

See also
Communes of the Hautes-Alpes department
 Pic de Rochebrune
 Pic de Petit Rochebrune

References

Communes of Hautes-Alpes
Hautes-Alpes communes articles needing translation from French Wikipedia